Ural (Bashkir and ) is a rural locality (a village) in Imangulovsky Selsoviet, Uchalinsky District, Bashkortostan, Russia. The population was 147 as of 2010. There are 2 streets.

Geography 
Ural is located 16 km south of Uchaly (the district's administrative centre) by road. Kudashevo is the nearest rural locality.

References 

Rural localities in Uchalinsky District